Alpine Theatre Project is a 501(c)(3) nonprofit professional theatre company based in Whitefish, Montana. It presents musicals, plays and concerts. It also provides education and outreach to students in Montana's Flathead Valley.

About the Company

History
ATP was formed in December, 2004 by actors David Ackroyd, Betsi Morrison and Luke Walrath. All three actors moved to Montana's Flathead Valley after sustaining successful careers on stage, in film and on television. Alpine Theatre Project was formed with the vision of creating a professional regional theatre within the outdoor recreational environment of Northwest Montana. Its mission is "to imagine without boundaries, to create vibrant professional entertainment and transformative arts education, to inspire the audience, artists, and next generation."  Its artists have performed in over 190 Broadway productions, won 4 Tony Awards, 7 Emmy Awards, 4 Golden Globe Awards, and 1 Academy Award.

Structure
Alpine Theatre Project is governed by a 15-member volunteer Board of Directors. It is managed by a full-time staff of 3. It hires full-time seasonal staff for its operations throughout the year.

Performance Space
Alpine Theatre Project (ATP) mounts its major productions in the Whitefish Performing Art Center, a 454 seat auditorium that is housed in the Whitefish Middle School and is owned by the Whitefish School District. The $5.5 million renovation of the space was funded through private community donations.

ATP's base of operations is in "The Garage," a converted auto shop at 6464 Highway 93 South in Whitefish.  Here, the company conducts its Academy classes and mounts smaller cabaret style shows.  The Garage is also home to ATP's annual Giving Tuesday Live Stream Thank-a-thon, in which the company thanks donors, displays examples of its work, and raises funds.

Union Affiliations
ATP operates under contract agreements with the following professional theatrical unions:
Actors Equity Association - the national labor union for professional stage actors and managers
United Scenic Artists - the national labor union for theatrical designers and scenic artists
Society of Stage Directors and Choreographers

Programs

Summer Season
Alpine Theatre Project produces the bulk of its shows during the summer months. It features book musicals, concerts, original productions, plays and its unique "Outside the Box," lightly staged play readings performed in a locale that is consistent with the content of the play.

Yuletide Affair
ATP produces the Yuletide Affair every December. This annual holiday concert changes format from year to year and features holiday songs and skits with a roster of ATP recurring artists. Beginning with the first "Yuletide Affair" in 2004 and continuing through 2019, every performance of the show has been sold out.

Onstage with the Glacier Symphony and Chorale
In January, 2007, ATP began collaborating with the Glacier Symphony and Chorale in presenting classic musicals in concert with a full symphony orchestra.

Other programs
Alpine Theatre Project also produces other concerts and fundraisers throughout the year. These concerts vary in content and format and take place in various communities around the Flathead Valley. ATP was the birthplace of two world-premiere plays—"Another Side of the Island, “created by and starring Academy Award winner Olympia Dukakis and “Stories by Heart,” created by and starring Emmy, Tony, and Golden Globe Award winner, John Lithgow.

Education & Outreach

Alpine  Theatre Project Kids! (ATP Kids!)
In 2008, ATP began offering theatre education to youth in the Flathead Valley. The after-school program offers education through performance, taught by ATP's company of artists. In the fall of 2008, AKTP began incorporating these classes into work on a full production for kids, by kids.  In 2020, ATP's education wing offers three six week youth theatre classes capped by performances: two for elementary students and one for high school students.  The ATP Academy is a summer theatre camp taught jointly by the ATP teaching staff and professional actors.

Internships
The ATP Internship program was begun in 2005 to offer theatre students in high-school and college a practical arts education. Interns work alongside ATP professionals during the summer season in every production department, including administrative. Students are eligible for college credit.

Production history
2004
Yuletide Affair 1
2005
My Fair Lady
K2
Yuletide Affair 2
2006
Camelot
Picasso at the Lapin Agile
Yuletide Affair 3
2007
The Sound of Music with the Glacier Symphony & Chorale
Godspell
I Love You, You're, Perfect, Now Change
Moonlight & Magnolias
Dracula
Yuletide Affair 4
2008
West Side Story with the Glacier Symphony & Chorale
The Full Monty
Pete 'n' Keely
Another Side of the Island starring Olympia Dukakis
Yuletide Affair 5

External links
 Alpine Theatre Project Website

Theatre companies in Montana
Whitefish, Montana
Tourist attractions in Flathead County, Montana
Education in Flathead County, Montana